Anteaeolidiella oliviae, is a species of sea slug, an aeolid nudibranch. It is a marine gastropod mollusc in the family Aeolidiidae.

Distribution
This species was described from specimens collected at San Diego, California. Its distribution is apparently confined to California.

Description
The body of Anteaeolidiella oliviae is translucent white with cream coloration on the back. There is sometimes an orange blotch on the head and another over the pericardium. The rhinophores have diagonal lamellae and are bright orange with white tips. The oral tentacles are mostly bright opaque white. The cerata are orange with white tips. Maximum size about 20 mm.

Ecology
This species feeds on sea anemones. It is probably mostly nocturnal in its habits.

References

Aeolidiidae
Gastropods described in 1966